Robert Seymour (1798 – 20 April 1836) was a British illustrator known for his illustrations for The Pickwick Papers by Charles Dickens and for his caricatures. He committed suicide after arguing with Dickens over the illustrations for Pickwick.

Early years

Seymour was born in Somerset, England in 1798, the second son of Henry Seymour and Elizabeth Bishop. Soon after moving to London Henry Seymour died, leaving his wife, two sons and daughter impoverished. In 1827 his mother died, and Seymour married his cousin Jane Holmes, having two children, Robert and Jane.

After his father died, Robert Seymour was apprenticed as a pattern-drawer to a Mr. Vaughan of Duke Street, Smithfield, London. Influenced by painter Joseph Severn RA, during frequent visits to his uncle Thomas Holmes of Hoxton, Robert's ambition to be a professional painter was achieved at the age of 24 when, in 1822, his painting of a scene from Torquato Tasso's Jerusalem Delivered, with over 100 figures, was exhibited at the Royal Academy.

He was commissioned to illustrate the works of Shakespeare; Milton; Cervantes, and Wordsworth. He also produced innumerable portraits, miniatures, landscapes, etc., as can be seen in two Sketchbooks; Windsor; Eaton; Figure Studies; Portraits at the Victoria and Albert Museum. After the rejection of his second Royal Academy submission, he continued to paint in oils, mastered techniques of copper engraving, and began illustrating books for a living.

From 1822–27, Seymour produced designs for a wide range of subjects including: poetry; melodramas; children's stories; and topographical and scientific works. A steady supply of such work enabled him to live comfortably and enjoy his library and fishing and shooting expeditions with his friends: Lacey the publisher, and the illustrator George Cruikshank. In 1827, the year of his mother's death and his marriage, Robert Seymour's publishers, Knight and Lacey, were made bankrupt, owing Seymour a considerable amount of money.

In 1827, Seymour then found steady employment when his etchings and engravings were accepted by the publisher Thomas McLean. Learning to etch on the newly fashionable steel-plates, Seymour then first began to specialize in caricatures and other humorous subjects. In 1830, having mastered the art of etching, Seymour then lithographed separate prints and book illustrations; he was then invited by McLean to produce the 1830 caricature magazine called  Looking Glass, as etched throughout by William Heath, for which Seymour produced four large lithographed sheets of illustrations, usually drawn several to a page, every month for the following six years, until his death in 1836.

Conflicts with Figaro
In 1831, Seymour began work for a new magazine called Figaro in London (pre-Punch), producing 300 humorous drawings and political caricatures to accompany the mundane, political topics of the day and the texts of Gilbert à Beckett (1811–56). This cheap weekly reflected the clever but abusive character of the owner and editor, à Beckett, a friend of Charles Dickens and the publisher of George Cruikshank, who, in 1827, argued against Seymour's parody of his work and nom-de-plume of 'Shortshanks'. Gilbert à Beckett later in 1834 insulted Seymour by replacing him with Cruikshank's brother. This partnership lasted until 1834, when à Beckett suffered a heavy financial loss and refused to pay Seymour. À Beckett then launched a public media campaign cruelly libelling Seymour, who resigned, returning only when Henry Mayhew replaced à Beckett as the Figaro editor. This humiliating public smear was to be attributed as a cause for the coroner's suicide verdict.

Nevertheless, Seymour's eminence as an illustrator now rivalled that of George Cruikshank and, as one of the greatest artists since the days of Hogarth, Sir Richard Phillips, predicted that, if he lived, he would become President of the Royal Academy. In 1834, at the height of his prosperity, Seymour independently launched a new series of lithographs, Sketches by Seymour (1834–36), all depicting expeditions of over-equipped and under-trained Cockneys pursuing cats, birds and stray pigs on foot and on horseback, as experienced in his 1827 fishing and shooting expeditions with his friend Cruickshank.

The Posthumous Papers of the Pickwick Club

Seymour's characters were popular, but all were lighthearted sporting or political in theme. The thin and large characters he developed were continued into the early life of the Pickwick Papers. There is however considerable controversy about who is intellectually responsible for the creation of the Pickwick Papers. It is agreed by Seymour's widow, the publisher Chapman and Hall, and Charles Dickens (1812–70) that the original idea prompting Dickens's writing commission came from Seymour who suggested to his existing publisher (Chapman and Hall) creating a magazine series of sporting illustrations with short written sketches linking them together in some way. The usual method was anecdotal stories. Further he developed the idea of a 'Nimrod Club' of sporting people having adventures as the framework for the sketches and illustrations. This is very much in the line of his already published Seymour's Sketches. The quality of the 'hack' writing (as such writing was known) in this volume is also valuable to provide contrast to Dickens's work. Edward Chapman agreed that the work should be issued in monthly parts, with descriptive text by Dickens. This was a very popular method at the time. However Charles Dickens, then only 22, was not the first choice as writer. From this point differences of opinion are rife. Seymour's widow claims the credit for choosing Dickens as the hack because his 'poverty' would ensure that he would write the sketch links for the illustrations. However a more reliable view is that the senior editor in the publishing house did not have time to complete the work so recommended Dickens on the basis of his recently published and successful 'Sketches by Boz', also in a monthly periodical format.

When Dickens was commissioned he made it clear that he was not a sporting person and therefore could not write this kind of sketch. But he liked the idea of a club and would write something the illustrations could be created from, reversing the order of the creative process. His story would have illustrations. It would not be a series of illustrations with a bit of story linking them together. Mr Winkle, the only main character really interested in sports, would be created to showcase Seymour but let Dickens write characters he wanted to. This was done to appease Seymour.

It seems probable that Seymour had a set of preliminary drawings for the Nimrod Club. He may have used them when discussing his idea with the publishers. His ideas for the Nimrod Club seem to go back to 1834 but due to his workload it doesn't seem to have been a project pursued until late 1835 or very early 1836 (the latter date is more probable). Reports suggest that Dickens was not commissioned until 10 February 1836 with a publication date of 31 March 1836 as the deadline. This was a very short timescale considering that there were serious disagreements about how the project would be developed after Dickens was appointed. Seymour may have used his previous illustrations to describe his original idea for the Nimrod Club but the creation of Mr Pickwick's character's design would imply that there was a prototype for him made by Seymour. This design seems to have been a thin man and was rejected by both the publisher and Dickens. The credit for the rotund final version was given by Dickens to Edward Chapman, as it was based on his acquaintance. However Seymour certainly had some characters similar to the round Mr Pickwick in his work before this time, although they are quite general in their detail and they appear similar in a number of his sketches. They appear to be more simple caricature observations whereas Mr Pickwick appears to be drawn more sharply into a strong visual image. Dickens had also written the first two chapters for Seymour to work from. From the facts that are known it seems logical then that Mr Pickwick was envisioned as a thin man, rejected and then redrawn on their suggestion of someone they knew and on Dickens writing. It also seems reasonable that Seymour used his previous work to help create the character, and Dickens is reported as saying that he had "made him a reality". Mr Pickwick seems to be an amalgamation of ideas from all these sources and is therefore not solely Seymour's creation. All the characteristics of the persona and the name appear to belong to Dickens.

It is not known how much of The Pickwick Papers Seymour created. He committed suicide before the second part of the book was completed and published. He shot himself with a shotgun (fowling piece) in his summer-house behind his home in Liverpool Road, Islington, on 20 April 1836. It is clear that Seymour was not in control of the process of creating The Pickwick Papers and was in fact commissioned on quite meager monetary terms for four illustrations per magazine edition. (This figure does not include the frontage piece which could be reused.) He seems to have received no payment for his idea, and his copyright for his illustrations seems to have been questionable. The frontage illustration that was issued on the first magazine edition reads "The Posthumous Papers of the Pickwick Club – containing a faithful record of the perambulations, perils, travels, adventures and Sporting Transactions of the corresponding members. Edited by 'Boz'. With Illustrations". Seymour isn't even mentioned as a named contributor. The frontage piece includes all sorts of fishing and shooting references and would fit well with the Nimrod Club idea but fits less well with the Pickwick Club. What sporting ideas may have been held as an original notion by Seymour were not realized in the magazine series, and after Seymour's death the focus of the stories becomes much clearer with more emphasis on ideas preferable to Dickens.

Dickens himself created controversy by saying that only 24 pages had been written for the second edition when Seymour committed suicide. It was pointed out by Joseph Grego in the 1899 book 'Pictorial Pickwickian' that in fact Seymour had created the draft image of "The Pickwickians in Mr. Wardle's Kitchen". The discrepancy is in the idea that the last illustration for the story was to go on page '50'. There were only meant to be 48 written pages complete or in draft stage. But the Pickwickians do end up in Mr Wardle's kitchen by the end of the second magazine issue regardless of what page this data was meant to have been published on. This small point has encouraged belief that Seymour was privy to ideas when there is no reliable evidence to suggest that this is true. No images have been found which belong to ideas written later in the series but only ideas which were published in line with commissioned work for the second magazine. The page count may not include illustrated pages (hardcopy reference required) which would increase the count to a total of 56 sides plus index and frontage pages etc. across the first two editions of the magazine.

The magazine was to be distributed at the end of each month. The second edition was finished with just three Seymour illustrations. Dickens changed the format for the 3rd edition of the magazine increasing the text to 32 pages and reducing the illustrations to two per issue.

Seymour's widow argued that the Pickwick Club would have existed without Dickens and this is not the case. It is clear that the Nimrod Club was Seymour's idea and was in effect a more story-driven version of the highly popular Seymour's sketches, but it is not The Pickwick Papers in its published version. It is clear, however, that it would have been much better for Seymour to pursue his idea for his magazine with another publisher or with a writer less interested in being the dominant partner. It is highly unlikely that Dickens would have created a platform like the Pickwick Club without Seymour's prompting idea, but it is clear that the Pickwick Club is Dickens's creative process in terms of content. Seymour's widow received no royalties, and the success of the project created a sense of injustice. The Pickwick Papers wouldn't have existed without Seymour, but the book and style that was popular and made the large fortune it did, wouldn't have existed if Seymour had had creative control and the format had been similar to Seymour's Sketches.

Seymour's suicide came after his struggle with mental illness and his breakdown in 1830. It is thought that Dickens had advertised for a new illustrator for The Pickwick Papers and it is clear that Seymour was struggling to design images in line with Dickens's requirements. "The Dying Clown" is harsh and emotional, a huge way from the funny and lighthearted illustrations which Seymour had envisioned for the series. Until English law changed in 1870, suicide could produce a verdict of felo de se (felon to self). This meant the person did not receive a religious burial and his family was denied any of his estate, which would go to the Crown by default. Therefore, no attributed royalties could go to his widow Jane Seymour from his work per se. The commission then passed to Robert William Buss, but, these being judged unsatisfactory, were then passed to Hablot Knight Browne known as Phiz from issue four of the magazine until its completion in 1837. Phiz also completed illustrations for the book version as well.

Death

Seymour died on 20 April 1836, aged 37, at home in Islington. He was found killed by a gunshot to the head, which was taken to be by his own hand.

Evidence was gathered of the incidents leading up to Seymour's death and this showed that 24 hours earlier, he had called at Dickens's family home and they had discussed the artwork for the chapter on the dying clown story. They had a few drinks (grog) then argued, after which Seymour left. On the day of his death, Chapman had returned the artwork of "The Dying Clown" (pictured) and had arranged to meet Seymour later that evening. Dickens's and Edward Chapman's statements of the incident, (albeit without explanation of how they knew) state that Seymour worked on the new plates well into that night and was found shot the next day. Dickens's statement, among others, mentions that he read about the incident in the morning papers.

When Chapman re-issued the, by now best-seller, The Pickwick Papers in book form, he included a disclaimer statement from Dickens stating; "Mr. Seymour never originated or suggested an incident, a phrase, or a word to be found in this book. Mr. Seymour died when only twenty-four pages of this book were published, and when assuredly not forty-eight were written"; that "All of the input from the artist was in response to the words that had already been written"; and, in continuation of the à Beckett smears, "that he took his own life through jealousy, as it was well known that Seymour's sanity had been questioned."

After an inquest, the coroner found that the cause of death had been suicide.

Seymour was buried at the church of St Mary Magdalene, Holloway.

Pickwick illustrations
Frontispiece
Mr Pickwick addresses the Club. – Chapter 1, Issue 1 (31 March 1836)
The Pugnacious Cabman. Chapter 2, Issue 1 (31 March 1836)
The Sagacious Dog. Chapter 2, Issue 1 (31 March 1836)
Dr Slammers's Defiance of Jingle. Chapter 2, Issue 1 (31 March 1836)
The Dying Clown. Chapter 3, Issue 2 (31 March 1836)
Mr Pickwick in Chase of his Hat. Chapter 4, Issue 2, (30 April 1836)
Mr Winkle Soothes the Refractory Steed. Chapter 5, Issue 2 (30 April 1836)
The Pickwickians in Wardle's Kitchen. For Chapter 5, Issue 2 (30 April 1836)(Unpublished but a copy included in the Pictorial Pickwickiana, Ed Joseph Grego, 1899) See Additional Notes on this.

Artworks and book illustrations

Tasso's Jerusalem Delivered (Royal Academy; 1821)
Figaro in London (300 illustrations):
Bells Life in London
Hoods Comic Almanacs
The Looking Glass (1830–36):
The History of Enfield (2 vols; 1823)
Public Characters of all Nations (3 vols; 1823)
Le Diable boiteux (1824)
My Uncle Timothy (1825)
Snatches from Oblivion
The March of Intellect (1829)
W.A.R: a Masque
Vagaries in the Quest of the Wild and Wonderful
The Heiress
The Omnibus
Seymour's Sporting Sketches
The Book of Christmas (1836) by Thomas Kibble Hervey (36 designs)
New Readings (1830–35)
Journal of a Landsman from Portsmouth to Lisbon, on Board His Majesty's Ship (1831)
Maxims and Hints for an Angler (1833)
The Comic Album (The Bloomsbury Christening; Dickens) (1834)
The Squib Annual of Poetry, Politics, and Personalities (1835–36)
Humorous Sketches (1834–36)
Sketches by Seymour (1834–36)
Library of Fiction
The Nimrod Club (1835–36)
The Posthumous Papers of the Pickwick Club (1836)

Royal Academy

Tasso's Jerusalem Delivered. Royal Academy (1822). by Robert Seymour.

"The Christians deterred by the terrors of enchantment, from felling timber to construct their machines of annoyance.
—And three succeeding days
The boldest warriors, urged by thirst of praise,
Assayed the dreary wood, but struck with dread,
Each knight by turns the threat’ning terror fled".

[Jerusalem Delivered, Book 13th.]

Jane Seymour to Charles Dickens

"His conduct calls to mind the lines put into Satan's mind by Milton".

"Get Riches first, get Wealth, and Treasure heap,
Not difficult, if thou hearken to me:
Riches are mine, Fortune is in my hand;
They whom I favour thrive in Wealth amain,
While Virtue, Valour, Wisdom sit in want."

(Paradise Regained.)

Obituary notices

"The success of the Pickwick Papers was due more to the artists pencil than the author’s pen; it is not generally known that the poor Seymour conceived the characters of Sam Weller and Pickwick before a line of the work was written". [The Sun, 1836].

"Seymour first furnished the idea of Pickwick Papers. Mr. Dickens wrote the first numbers to his plates. / Seymour was one of the greatest artists since the days of Hogarth" (1697–1764). [Franklins Miscellany, 1836].

"The head of the production of two clever artists …the one, a long established favourite; the other, Mr. Seymour, a gentleman of far superior talent. Mr. Seymour will have the management of all future volumes, so far as the engravings are concerned". [Odd Volume. 1836].

Seymour's tombstone

Seymour was buried in 1836 at St Mary Magdalene Church in Islington. Alterations to the church grounds led to Seymour's tombstone being removed from the grave site and considered "lost" until 2006 when it was discovered in the church's crypt by author Stephen Jarvis. The tombstone has since been acquired by the Charles Dickens Museum at 48 Doughty Street, London where it went on permanent public display from 27 July 2010.

Death and Mr Pickwick
In his 2014 novel, which is part dramatised fictional biography of Seymour, part forensic analysis of the "authorial" controversy, part socio-literary history of the entire Pickwick phenomenon, Stephen Jarvis puts together a substantial case against Dickens's and Chapman's accepted version of events. This is plausibly based on inconsistencies in Dickens's various prefaces to the book and flaws in Chapman's supporting testimony, as well as a scrupulous examination of other evidential sources, including internal evidence from Seymour's own work on the project. In particular, the idea that he ever suggested a "Nimrod Club" publication, based on sporting illustrations, comes under strong scrutiny: Jarvis's narrator concludes that not only the idea, but also the name, physiognomy and character of Mr Pickwick originated in Seymour's imagination.

Notes

References
The Origin of the Pickwick Papers. by Jane Seymour.
Dickens and his Illustrators, by Frederic George Kitton
D.N.B. by Michael Heseltine.
Dickens House Museum. Archives (Verifications and letters by Curators 2 & 3)
Joseph Grego Estate auction catalogue; Joseph Grego's personal Negatives. (BM etc. provenances)
British Museum. Indexed (hard-copy) file references.
British Library. Indexed (hard-copy) file references.
Edward McDermott (19th century: Grego associate)
Stephen Mowbray McDermott (21st century: Grego negatives etc.)

External links
 
 
 
 Seymour on The Victorian Web
 Pictorial Pickwick Papers

1798 births
1836 deaths
Artists who committed suicide
Charles Dickens
English illustrators
English etchers
English caricaturists
Suicides in Islington
1830s suicides
Suicides by firearm in England